St. Paul's Balika Maha Vidyalaya, Kelaniya is a provincial school for girls in the Kelaniya, Sri Lanka. Affiliation with St. Paul's Kelaniya, Roman Catholic church and convent.

References

Provincial schools in Sri Lanka
Schools in Gampaha District